is a railway station on the Nishikigawa Seiryū Line in Iwakuni, Yamaguchi Prefecture, Japan. It is operated by the Nishikigawa Railway, a third-sector railway company.

Lines

Adjacent stations

History
The station was opened on 18 March 1993 as an added station on the existing track of the Nishikigawa Seiryū Line.

Passenger statistics
In fiscal 2011, the station was used by an average of 4 passengers daily.

References

Railway stations in Japan opened in 1993
Railway stations in Yamaguchi Prefecture